Nizhny Ikorets is a rural locality (a selo) and the administrative center of Nizhneikoretskoye Rural Settlement, Liskinsky District, Voronezh Oblast, Russia. The population was 1,696 as of 2010. There are 14 streets.

Geography 
Nizhny Ikorets is located 18 km east of Liski (the district's administrative centre) by road. Maslovka is the nearest rural locality.

References 

Rural localities in Liskinsky District